Toonavora is a genus of moths of the family Tortricidae.

Species
Toonavora aellaea (Turner, 1916)
Toonavora spermatophaga (Diakonoff & Bradley, 1976)

See also
List of Tortricidae genera

References

External links
tortricidae.com

Enarmoniini
Tortricidae genera
Taxa named by Marianne Horak